is an autobahn in Germany. It is colloquially known as Ostseeautobahn ("Baltic Freeway") or Küstenautobahn ("Coastal Freeway") due to its geographic location near the Baltic Sea coastline. The road is not built along a straight line, instead it is built near important cities (Wismar, Rostock, Stralsund), to make it more beneficial for travel between these cities, and also to serve as bypass.

Construction started in 1992, only two years after the German reunification, near the junction Wismar-Nord and was completed in December 2005, when the last section was opened near Tribsees by Chancellor Angela Merkel. Building costs are estimated at € 1.8 billion.
279 km of the autobahn are in Mecklenburg-Vorpommern, 27 km in Brandenburg and 30 km in Schleswig-Holstein, making the A 20 the longest continuously built new autobahn since 1945.

On 28 July 2009 the western extension started with the opening between Autobahnkreuz Lübeck and junction Geschendorf. In the meantime the next six kilometers to the temporary end at Weede has been opened for traffic. The extension and opening of the section between the temporary end in Weede and Autobahnkreuz Bad Segeberg is planned for the end of 2010. Further extension west (designated A 22 until June 2010) is planned and awaiting funding, including a tunnel under the Elbe and a 2-way connection with the also-planned A 26.

North of Hamburg the A 20 will have a unique function, namely the connection of the highways A 1, A 21, A 7 and A 23, but it will also function as a northern bypass of the city-region of Hamburg which will take traffic going from France and the Benelux countries to Denmark and Sweden away from Hamburg.

Exit list

|-
|colspan="3"|

| built as 

|-
|colspan="3"|

| built as 

 
    
     

(Lübeck Airport)

 

 

 
 

 

|}

References

External links 

20
A020
A020
A020